The 2014 Latvian Supercup was scheduled to be the second edition of the Latvian Supercup, an annual football match organised by Latvian Football Federation and contested by the reigning champions of the two main Latvian club competitions, the Latvian Higher League and the Latvian Football Cup. It was intended to be played on 8 March 2014, between the 2013 Latvian Higher League and 2012–13 Latvian Football Cup winners Ventspils and the 2013 Latvian Higher League runner-up Skonto. The match was rescheduled to an unknown date.

Teams

References

External links
 Association "Latvian Football Higher League" 

Latvian Supercup
Supercup